Zanker is a surname. Notable people with the surname include:

Bill Zanker (born 1954), American entrepreneur
Eden Zanker (born 1999), Australian rules footballer
Heinrich der Zänker (951–995), Bavarian Duke
Paul Zanker (born 1937), German archaeologist

See also
Anker (name)